Verconia decussata is a species of colourful sea slug, a dorid nudibranch, a shell-less marine gastropod mollusk in the family Chromodorididae.

Distribution 
This marine species occurs off New Caledonia.

Description

Ecology

References

 Risbec, J. 1928. Contribution à l’étude des nudibranches Néo-Calédoniens. Faune des Colonies Françaises 2(1): 1–328.
 Rudman, W.B. 2001. Noumea decussata Risbec, 1928. Australian Museum, Sydney

Chromodorididae
Gastropods described in 1928